This is a list of films which placed number one at the weekend box office for the year 2010 in the Philippines.

*Local Film

References

 

Philippines
2010
Numb